Tosh Van der Sande (born 28 November 1990) is a Belgian professional cyclist, who currently rides for UCI WorldTeam . Van der Sande is considered as a classics specialist.

Career

Early career
As a junior, he found success in track cycling. In 2011, he won the Liège–Bastogne–Liège U23.

Professional career
He extended his contract in 2013, and has since then remained in the team.

After he accidentally listed the wrong nasal spray brand in the paperwork at the 2018 Six Days of Ghent where he returned a positive test for prednisolone, a substance found in the nasal spray Sofrasolone, he was temporarily suspended by his team. He was later cleared of any wrongdoing by the UCI.

Major results

2006
 National Novice Track Championships
1st  Points race
1st  Scratch
2nd  Sprint
 National Junior Track Championships
2nd  Madison
2nd  Team pursuit
2007
 National Junior Track Championships
1st  Points race
1st  Scratch
2nd Madison
2nd Team sprint
 3rd Aalst–St. Truiden
 3rd UIV Cup, Gent
2008
 UCI Junior Track World Championships
1st  Points race
2nd  Madison
 National Junior Track Championships
1st  Points race
1st  Scratch
1st  Madison
1st  Team pursuit
 UIV Cup
1st Gent
2nd Munich
 1st Stage 2 Ronde van Antwerpen
 2nd Overall Giro di Toscana Juniors
1st Points classification
1st Stages 1 & 3
 2nd Aalst–St. Truiden
 4th Overall Trofeo Karlsberg
1st Stage 4
 5th Overall Münsterland Tour
1st Points classification
1st Stage 2
 10th Road race, UCI Juniors World Championships
2009
 1st Stage 4 Tour de la Province de Namur
2010
 10th Liège–Bastogne–Liège Espoirs
2011
 1st Liège–Bastogne–Liège Espoirs
 1st Stage 1 Vuelta a Navarra
 3rd Overall Tour de Liège
1st Stage 5
 3rd La Côte Picarde
 4th Overall Le Triptyque des Monts et Châteaux
1st Stages 1 & 3
 6th Flèche Ardennaise
 8th Overall Tour de Normandie
 9th Road race, UCI Road World Under-23 Championships
2012
 1st  Mountains classification, Three Days of De Panne
 3rd Borsbeek Individueel
 4th Kampioenschap van Vlaanderen
 7th Gullegem Koerse
2013
 9th Grand Prix Impanis-Van Petegem
2014
 2nd Grand Prix Impanis-Van Petegem
 4th Omloop van het Houtland
2015
 2nd Paris–Tours
2016
 1st Stage 2 Tour de l'Ain
 7th Overall Driedaagse van West-Vlaanderen
 10th Nationale Sluitingsprijs
2017
 2nd Overall Tour de Wallonie
 6th Bruges Cycling Classic
2018
 10th Halle–Ingooigem
2019
 2nd Overall Tour de Wallonie
1st Stage 5
2021
 2nd Primus Classic
 3rd Brussels Cycling Classic
 3rd Grand Prix de Wallonie
 5th Overall Danmark Rundt
 5th Dwars door Vlaanderen
 10th Amstel Gold Race
2022
 9th Overall ZLM Tour

Grand Tour general classification results timeline

References

External links

1990 births
Belgian male cyclists
Living people
Cyclists from Antwerp Province
People from Wijnegem